The Graduate Design Program in Mechanical Engineering is part of Design Center Colorado within the Mechanical Engineering Department at the University of Colorado Boulder, in Boulder, Colorado.

Background 

The Graduate Design Program began in January, 2010.  Design faculty members include Mark Rentschler, Daria Kotys-Schwartz, Derek Reamon, Greg Rieker and Shalom Ruben

Curriculum 
The Graduate Design Program is focused on educating graduate (both Masters and Doctoral) students through hands-on design learning and industry-sponsored projects. Graduate students in any of the Mechanical Engineering Tracks can enroll in the Graduate Design Program through the Design Pathway. The cornerstone of this program is a three-semester sequence of courses that begin in January, and culminates the following year in May. The first course in this sequence is Advanced Product Design (APD). APD is a studio class that focuses on consumer product design and helps equip students with the tools necessary to complete the following, two semester Graduate Design projects course. In Grad Design, the teams, composed of 3-4 students, have access to funds from the sponsoring company, and meet regularly with a mentor from the sponsoring company and a faculty advisor.  Teams are tasked with delivering a near turn-key product at the end of the 9-month project.

References

Further reading 
Rentschler, M.E., Zable, J.A., “Beyond Capstone Design – Developing a New Graduate Design Pedagogy and Program,” Capstone Design Conference, Boulder, CO, June, 2010.

External links
Official Graduate Design Program Web Site (http://www.designcenter.colorado.edu/#!graduate/c1odo) 
Official Design Center Colorado Web Site (http://www.designcenter.colorado.edu/) 
Official Department of Mechanical Engineering Web Site (http://www.colorado.edu/MCEN/)
College of Engineering and Applied Science (http://www.colorado.edu/engineering/)

Graduate Design Program in Mechanical Engineering
Graduate Design Program in Mechanical Engineering
Engineering schools and colleges in the United States
Mechanical engineering organizations